Scott Township may refer to:

Canada 

 Scott Township, Ontario, a geographic township and former municipality

United States

Arkansas
 Scott Township, Lonoke County, Arkansas, in Lonoke County, Arkansas
 Scott Township, Mississippi County, Arkansas, in Mississippi County, Arkansas
 Scott Township, Poinsett County, Arkansas, in Poinsett County, Arkansas
 Scott Township, Sharp County, Arkansas, in Sharp County, Arkansas

Illinois
 Scott Township, Champaign County, Illinois
 Scott Township, Ogle County, Illinois

Indiana
 Scott Township, Kosciusko County, Indiana
 Scott Township, Montgomery County, Indiana
 Scott Township, Steuben County, Indiana
 Scott Township, Vanderburgh County, Indiana

Iowa
 Scott Township, Buena Vista County, Iowa
 Scott Township, Fayette County, Iowa
 Scott Township, Floyd County, Iowa
 Scott Township, Franklin County, Iowa
 Scott Township, Fremont County, Iowa
 Scott Township, Hamilton County, Iowa
 Scott Township, Henry County, Iowa
 Scott Township, Johnson County, Iowa
 Scott Township, Madison County, Iowa
 Scott Township, Mahaska County, Iowa
 Scott Township, Montgomery County, Iowa
 Scott Township, Poweshiek County, Iowa

Kansas
 Scott Township, Bourbon County, Kansas
 Scott Township, Lincoln County, Kansas, in Lincoln County, Kansas
 Scott Township, Linn County, Kansas, in Linn County, Kansas
 Scott Township, Scott County, Kansas, in Scott County, Kansas

Minnesota
 Scott Township, Stevens County, Minnesota

Missouri
 Scott Township, Taney County, Missouri

Nebraska
 Scott Township, Buffalo County, Nebraska
 Scott Township, Holt County, Nebraska

North Dakota
 Scott Township, Adams County, North Dakota

Ohio
 Scott Township, Adams County, Ohio
 Scott Township, Brown County, Ohio
 Scott Township, Marion County, Ohio
 Scott Township, Sandusky County, Ohio

Pennsylvania
 Scott Township, Allegheny County, Pennsylvania
 Scott Township, Columbia County, Pennsylvania
 Scott Township, Lackawanna County, Pennsylvania
 Scott Township, Lawrence County, Pennsylvania
 Scott Township, Wayne County, Pennsylvania

See also
Scott (disambiguation)

Township name disambiguation pages